David Martin (born 25 January 1964) is a Scottish retired footballer who played for Alloa Athletic, Dumbarton, Queen of the South and St Johnstone.

References

1964 births
Scottish footballers
Dumbarton F.C. players
Alloa Athletic F.C. players
Queen of the South F.C. players
St Johnstone F.C. players
Scottish Football League players
Living people
Association football midfielders